The Mallet locomotive is a type of articulated steam railway locomotive, invented by the Swiss engineer Anatole Mallet (1837–1919).

The front of the locomotive articulated on a bogie. The compound steam system fed steam at boiler pressure to high-pressure cylinders driving the rear set of driving wheels (rigidly connected to the boiler). The exhaust steam from these cylinders was fed into a low-pressure receiver and was then sent to low-pressure cylinders that powered the driving wheels on the swiveling bogie towards the front of locomotive.

Compounding

Steam under pressure is converted into mechanical energy more efficiently if it is used in a compound engine; in such an engine steam from a boiler is used in high-pressure (HP) cylinders and then under reduced pressure in a second set of cylinders. The lower-pressure steam occupies a larger volume and the low-pressure (LP) cylinders are larger than the high-pressure cylinders.

A third stage (triple expansion) may be employed. Compounding was proposed by the British engineer Jonathan Hornblower in 1781.

The American engineer W. S. Hudson patented a system of compounding for railway locomotives in 1873 in which he proposed an intermediate receiver surrounded by hot gas from the fire, so that the low-pressure steam is partly superheated.

Mallet proposed cross-compounding in which a conventional steam locomotive configuration would have one high-pressure cylinder and one low-pressure cylinder. Several others followed for railways in mainland Europe.

The London and North Western Railway locomotive engineer F W Webb adopted the idea and converted some existing locomotives in 1879, followed by de Glehn and others in the 1880s and several American engineers in the 1890s which included some vertical boiler railcar applications.

Articulation

Mallet found typical main line railways were unwilling to adopt his ideas. In 1884, he proposed compounding combined with articulation; on lightly engineered secondary lines this could give greater power to locomotives whose axle load and size were limited. His patent 162876 in France specified four cylinders, two large and two small, with one pair of cylinders acting on two or three fixed axles, and the other pair acting on axles mounted in a swivelling truck.

The weight of the front part of the boiler was to be supported on an arc-shaped radial bearing. The truck could therefore turn into a curve and move to some extent laterally. Typically the support bearing was placed beneath the smokebox, hollowed and with a sliding seal to provide a route for exhaust steam from the low-pressure cylinders to discharge through a blastpipe within the smoke box.

Mallet considered that the major advantage of this arrangement was that it enabled the cylinders on the truck to be fed with low-pressure steam: the high-pressure cylinders were on the fixed main frame and only low-pressure steam needed to be carried through movable pipes to the swivelling truck.

The Mallet concept
This then was what became understood as a "Mallet" locomotive: an articulated locomotive in which the rear set of driving wheels were fixed in the main frame of the locomotive; an articulated truck carrying a second set of driving wheels; and compounding in which the high-pressure cylinders drove the axles on the main frame and the articulated axles were driven by low-pressure steam.

Mallet asserted that the advantages of his concept were:
 all the locomotive weight would be adhesive, yet there would be great flexibility of the locomotive as a vehicle;
 the difficulties with Meyer, Fairlie and other then-existing articulated systems would be eliminated as the moving pipes would be carrying low-pressure steam at only  pressure, and would be easier to keep steam-tight; and
 A simple type of very powerful locomotive would be created.

The large-diameter pipe conveying the low-pressure steam from the high-pressure to the low-pressure cylinders acted also as a receiver, forming a buffer for the gas flow.

Independent cut-offs for the high-pressure and low-pressure cylinders were advocated by Mallet, but driving standards were inadequate and he later used combined cut-off control.

European versions

Large numbers of Mallet designs for narrow gauge railways were built, but in 1889 the first six standard gauge examples were built by J A Maffei for the Swiss Central railways, and an 87 tonne  banker (US: pusher) for the Gotthard Bahn, the last being the most powerful and heaviest locomotive in the world at the time. By 1892 110 Mallets were at work, of which 24 were standard gauge; by 1900 there were nearly 400, of which 218 were on standard gauge or Russian gauge.

One of the examples in Germany was the class of s built by Maffei for Bavarian State Railways between 1913 and 1923.

The strongest Mallet locomotives in Europe were the members of the MÁV 601 which was built for the Hungarian State Railways, it was a  locomotive. With their 22.5 meter length, 163.3 tonnes total weight and 2200 KW power, the MÁV 601 was the biggest, the heaviest and most powerful steam locomotive built before and during the First World War in Europe.

North American versions
The first Mallet locomotive in the United States was Baltimore & Ohio Railroad number 2400, built by Alco  in 1904. Received negatively at first due to speed limitation arising from the short wheelbase and stiff suspension, it gained support during service, and it was soon followed by Baldwin examples, and then steadily heavier and more powerful successors.

In Canada, the Canadian Pacific Railway experimented with an unusual design of Mallet promoted by H.H. Vaughan, then Chief Mechanical Officer and Assistant to the CPR Vice-President. Their in-house compound 0-6-6-0 design located both the high and low pressure cylinders adjacent to one another in the center of the locomotive driving opposite directions.  Produced in the CPR's Angus shops, road numbers 1950 to 1954 were outshopped between 1909 and 1911.  An additional "simple" (as opposed to compound) unit with road #1955 featuring the same arrangement was also produced. These were used in helper service in the Rockies and Selkirks.  The units were unpopular with crews owing to frequent steam leakages and derailments resulting from the lack of pilot wheels.  While not an outright failure these were considered an unsuccessful design, and by 1916-1917 these units had been converted to a conventional 2-10-0 arrangement. These six locomotives were ultimately the only articulated locomotives operated by a Canadian railway.

These were unsuccessful, and later engines used conventional boilers.

The largest compound Mallets were ten 2-10-10-2s built for the Virginian by Alco in 1918; in pairs they pushed coal trains headed by a 2-8-8-2. The AT&SF also had a number of compound 2-10-10-2's, assembled in their own shops from existing 2-10-2's using a kit, supplied by Baldwin, consisting of the front 10-wheel frame and a boiler extension.

Although compounds had been considered obsolescent since the 1920s, C&O thought them appropriate, in the late 1940s, for low-speed coal-mine pickup runs converging on the classification yard at Russell, Kentucky. Only ten (of 25 originally ordered) were built before the order was cancelled, the last delivered in September 1949. The final loco, Chesapeake and Ohio 1309, is preserved on the Western Maryland Scenic Railroad. The 1309 was also the last steam locomotive that Baldwin built for the North American market.

The last compound Mallets to remain in use on a major North American railroad were the N&W class Y6b 2-8-8-2 locomotives, retired in July 1959. Norfolk & Western 2156 is the sole surviving Y6a, preserved at the National Museum of Transportation in St. Louis.

Simple expansion versions in the US

By about 1920, the U.S. version of the Mallet as a huge slow-speed pusher had reached a plateau; the size of the low-pressure cylinders became a limiting factor even on the large loading gauge permitted in the U.S., and reciprocating masses posed serious dynamic problems above walking pace. Moreover, there were adhesion stability problems where the front engine tended to slip and then stall uncontrollably because of an imbalance of tractive effort and axle load, accentuated by the drawbar reaction, and inability of the intermediate steam receiver to accommodate the sudden pressure change. This was further worsened by dynamic instability of the front end in running.

The Chesapeake and Ohio Railway introduced 25 simple (non-compound expansion) 2-8-8-2 locomotives in 1924 and 20 more in 1926. Although the simple-expansion concept diverged from Mallet's original patent, the locomotives were clearly a continuation of the concept and were still referred to as "Mallet" locomotives. As the front truck cylinders were now using boiler pressure steam, special arrangements were necessary to deliver it, through the truck pivot pin where only radial movement took place. These new locomotives took over service on a  division; a single locomotive hauled  in five hours.

Mallet development culminated in 1941 with the 4-8-8-4 Big Boy type on the Union Pacific railroad.

The last Mallets
These U.S. locomotives were paralleled to some extent by heavy-haul versions in the USSR, though without any attempt at faster running. Two 2-8-8-4 examples built in Russia in 1954–55 were probably the last Mallets built in Europe.

Other continents

Although it had found early favor in Europe, especially on lightly engineered railways, the Mallet type was generally superseded by the Garratt locomotive by the mid-1920s.

In the Dutch East Indies, now the Republic of Indonesia, several types and sizes remained in use into the 1980s. In 1962, the Indonesian state railways DKA ordered a series of 0-4-4-2s, basically an updated version of the earlier Dutch design, for the old Atjeh (now Aceh) tramway. Constructed by Nippon Sharyo in Japan, they were the only Mallets built in Asia. Smaller Mallets were used by plantations and other industries, all of the 0-4-4-0 type. But meanwhile in Garut - Cibatu in West Java, DKA ordered bigger 2-6-6-0 Mogul Mallets Like the extinct mallet tank Indonesian Railways CC10 Class and the even larger CC50 class along with the All extinct 2-8-8-0 Bull Moose like DD50 - 52 class. Only 3 CC50 engines survived. It was CC 50 01 ( Prototype ) in the Transportation museum in TMII, CC 50 22 in Railway Museum (Netherlands) and CC 50 29 in the Ambarawa Railway Museum. But unlike the CC 50 class, all of the CC 10s & DD 50 -52s was sadly cut up for scrap. We still hope for this engine to be preserved in railway museums, but there is a chance to make a new built of the class.

Mallets were employed in Brazilian , tight-radius railroads.

One Mallet ran in New Zealand, and is preserved at Glenbrook Vintage Railway, Auckland.

Three Mallets ran in Australia, including one on the Magnet Tramway in Tasmania.

Preservation
Several Mallets have been preserved, some in operational condition. A number of the Union Pacific "Big Boys", are preserved, including one overlooking Omaha, Nebraska where UP is based. In January 2014, Big Boy #4014 was removed from its museum ground parking track in Pomona, California, and hauled to Cheyenne, Wyoming, for restoration to operating condition; this was completed in May 2019. No. 4014 is the largest, heaviest, and most powerful operational steam locomotive in the world.

Two of Union Pacific's Challengers survived into preservation. Challenger #3985 was the largest operational steam locomotive in the world until the restoration of UP 4014. It was taken out of service in October 2010 due to mechanical problems and retired from the Union Pacific's excursion program in January 2020. As of January 2023, No. 3985 is being restored to operating condition by the Railroading Heritage of Midwest America.

Chesapeake & Ohio 2-6-6-2 #1309, the last domestic steam locomotive built by Baldwin, was scheduled for restoration in September 2017.  "New as they were, the last C&O steam engines never got adequate maintenance, lengthening the list of work needed to bring 1309 back to life."  The locomotive was fired up and moved under her own steam on December 31, 2020, the first time she had done so in 64 years. On December 17, 2021, C&O 1309 (now WMSR 1309) entered excursion service on the Western Maryland Scenic Railroad.

The single surviving example of a cab-forward Mallet is Southern Pacific 4294, on display at the California State Railroad Museum in Sacramento, California.

Several smaller logging-railroad Mallets have been restored to operating condition, including  Black Hills Central #110  in Hill City, South Dakota,  Clover Valley Lumber Company #4 in Sunol, California, and  Deep River Logging "Skookum" #7 in Garibaldi, Oregon.

CC 50 22, an early Dutch-built Indonesian Mallets has been returned to the Netherlands and is now exhibited in the Dutch Railway Museum but meanwhile, the other 2 like CC 50 01 is preserved in Transportation Museum in TMII and CC 50 29 is preserved in the Ambarawa Railway Museum.

Another industrial type has been purchased and restored by the Statfold Barn Railway in the UK. This saw its first operation in Europe in 2011 and after initial trials on the owners' railway, was transferred to the Welsh Highland Railway as its power is better suited to that railway.

A number of Mallets were constructed for the Nordhausen Wernigerode Eisenbahn, now part of the Harz Narrow Gauge Railways system in Germany. Running numbers 99 5901-3 and 99 5906 are in working order.

The Blonay–Chamby museum railway has two Mallets. First to be acquired was the Hanomag G 2x 3/3  No104. At 56 tonnes this locomotive was one of the largest steam metre gauge locos ever built in Europe. It was in service until 1979, and as of September 2021 is still under restoration. There is also a G 2x 2/2  No.105 built by Maschinenfabrik Karlsruhe. As of September 2021 it hauls tourist trains on 5% grades.

ABPF-SC (Brazilian Association for Railroad Preservation – Santa Catarina branch) has restored a  Mallet to working order. It hauls tourist steam trains on 3% grades. The first official train ran on April 30, 2017.

Terminology
As a French-speaking Swiss, Mallet pronounced his name accordingly, something like "Ma-lay".

Mallet's original patent specifies compound expansion, but after his death in 1919 many locomotives (particularly in the United States) were articulated Mallet style without using compounding (for instance the Union Pacific Big Boy). When fleets of such locomotives appeared in the middle 1920s the trade press called them "Simple Mallets" — i.e., simple locomotives articulated like Mallets. The term "Mallet" continued to be widely used for simple as well as compound locomotives.

References

External links 

 Baldwin description of Mallet locomotives from 1912
 Proctor, MN Steam Locomotive No. 225
 Lake Superior Railroad Museum Duluth, Missabe and Iron Range Steam Locomotive No. 227
 Lake County Historical Society Steam Locomotive No. 229

 
Steam locomotive types
Compound locomotives
Articulated locomotives